Dwight Muhammad Qawi (born Dwight Braxton; January 5, 1953) is an American former professional boxer who competed from 1978 to 1998. He was a world champion in two weight classes, having held the WBC and Ring magazine light heavyweight titles from 1981 to 1983, and the WBA cruiserweight title from 1985 to 1986. Qawi was inducted into the International Boxing Hall of Fame in 2004.

Early life
Qawi, then known as Dwight Braxton, was born in Baltimore, Maryland, but grew up in Camden, New Jersey, where he got involved with crime at a young age. He was eventually convicted of armed robbery and spent around five years in prison.

It was in Rahway State Prison that Braxton found his place in life. The prison had an extensive boxing program and one of its inmates, James Scott, was a light heavyweight title contender who fought several times inside the prison itself. Braxton took up the sport, and when he was released from prison in 1978, immediately became a professional boxer. Qawi's style was most often likened to Joe Frazier and with good reason as he had trained in Frazier's Philadelphia gym as a professional. He converted to Islam in the early 80s and had his name changed from Dwight Braxton to Dwight Muhammad Qawi.

Professional career

He went 1-1-1 in his first three pro fights, but then reeled off 14 straight victories to move into the world rankings at light heavyweight. The last of those wins came on September 5, 1981, when Braxton returned to Rahway to fight Scott, with the winner promised a shot at Matthew Saad Muhammad's WBC world championship belt. Braxton won a unanimous 10-round decision.

On December 19 of the same year, Braxton faced Saad Muhammad in Atlantic City. Braxton was the underdog against Saad, one of the most popular fighters of his generation and a fellow Hall of Famer, but Braxton defeated him on a 10th-round technical knockout and became a world champion for the first time. It was shortly after this that he announced his conversion to Islam and changed his name.

He defended the title three times in the next 15 months, knocking out Jerry Martin, Saad Muhammad a second time and Eddie Davis. On March 18, 1983, he lost a close but unanimous decision to WBA champion Michael Spinks in a unification bout.

Qawi felt that making the division's 175-pound weight limit had drained him physically, and resolved to seek another world title in the newly created cruiserweight division. Freed of the need to fight to keep his weight down, Qawi reeled off another series of wins and claimed the WBA cruiserweight title on July 7, 1985, knocking out Piet Crous in Crous' native South Africa.

He won two more fights, including a victory over former world heavyweight titlist Leon Spinks, before accepting a challenge from Olympian Evander Holyfield on July 12, 1986. The fight, in Holyfield's hometown of Atlanta, went the full 15 rounds with Holyfield winning a split decision.

After the loss to Holyfield, Qawi fought off and on for the next 12 years, but never regained a world title. He rematched with Holyfield in 1987 for the WBA and IBF cruiserweight titles, but was stopped in the fourth round.

After a short stint in the heavyweight ranks, where in 1988 he lost to George Foreman by knockout in seven rounds, being forced to quit from exhaustion, he tried to regain the cruiserweight title. On November 27, 1989, he dropped a split decision to Robert Daniels for Holyfield's vacated WBA title.

Qawi retired in 1999 at the age of 46, with a career record of 41 wins, 11 losses and one draw, with 25 wins by way of knockout. Currently, he works as a boxing trainer in New Jersey.

Life after boxing 
In 1998, Dwight began working at the Lighthouse, a drug and alcohol rehabilitation center in Mays Landing, New Jersey. He works with both adults and adolescents and is a patient advocate.

Professional boxing record

See also
List of world light-heavyweight boxing champions
List of world cruiserweight boxing champions

References

External links

|-

1953 births
Living people
American male boxers
African-American boxers
African-American Muslims
American Muslims
Converts to Islam
Sportspeople from Camden, New Jersey
Boxers from Baltimore
Boxers from New Jersey
International Boxing Hall of Fame inductees
World light-heavyweight boxing champions
World cruiserweight boxing champions
World Boxing Council champions
World Boxing Association champions
The Ring (magazine) champions
21st-century African-American people
20th-century African-American sportspeople